A stain is a discoloration that can be clearly distinguished from the surface, material, or medium it is found upon. They are caused by the chemical or physical interaction of two dissimilar materials. Accidental staining may make materials appear used, degraded or permanently unclean. Intentional staining is used in biochemical research and for artistic effect, such as wood staining, rust staining and stained glass.

Types
There can be intentional stains (such as wood stains or paint), indicative stains (such as food coloring or adding a substance to make bacteria visible under a microscope), natural stains (such as rust on iron or a patina on bronze), and accidental stains such as ketchup and synthetic oil on clothing.

Different types of material can be stained by different substances, and stain resistance is an important characteristic in modern textile engineering.

Formation
The primary method of stain formation is surface stains, where the staining substance is spilled out onto the surface or material and is trapped in the fibers, pores, indentations, or other capillary structures on the surface. The material that is trapped coats the underlying material, and the stain reflects back light according to its own color. Applying paint, spilled food, and wood stains are of this nature.

A secondary method of stain involves a chemical or molecular reaction between the material and the staining material. Many types of natural stains fall into this category.

Finally, there can also be molecular attraction between the material and the staining material, involving being held in a covalent bond and showing the color of the bound substance.

Properties
In many cases, stains are affected by heat and may become reactive enough to bond with the underlying material. Applied heat, such as from ironing, dry cleaning or sunlight, can cause a chemical reaction on an otherwise removable stain, turning it into a chemical.

Removal
Various laundry techniques exist to attempt to remove or reduce existing stains. Stain remover is an important type of chemical in laundry detergents and some removers are formulated to be applied directly onto stains. The removal of some stains require other chemicals or special techniques. Use of an inappropriate technique could make permanent an otherwise removable stain or cause unwanted discolouration of the clothing.

Information about stain removal can be found in magazines, books, advertisements or online:
 Stain removal guide, American Cleaning Institute
 Stain solutions, University of Illinois
 Stain removal advice from Procter & Gamble: UK, Canada

See also
Biodegradation
Bleach
Dye
Foxing
Permanent marker
Weathering steel

References

Further reading
Stain & Spot Removal Handbook: Consumer guide. by the editors of Consumer Guide. Skokie, Ill: Beekman House, 1981. 9780517316832
Zia, Stephanie. Stain Removal. London: Hamlyn, 2005. Distributed in the U.S. and Canada by Sterling Pub. Co., 2005. 9780600611240
Soto, Anne MarieStain Rescue!: The A-Z Guide to Removing Smudges, Spots & Other Spills By good Housekeeping Institute (New York, N.Y.). Published by Sterling Publishing Company, 2007 ISBN
 Mendelson, Cheryl Laundry: The Home Comforts Book of Caring for Clothes and Linens Simon & Schuster, 2005

External links
 
 

Laundry
Artistic techniques